SEMCAT is computer software used by insurance agents to increase their quoting efficiency. The name is an acronym for Single Entry Multiple Carrier Assistance Tool. The software allows agents to type quoting information once and have that information transfer to multiple insurance carriers' websites, instead of having to retype that information every time a quote is needed from a different carrier.

SEMCAT is headquartered in the Turbine Flats Project of Lincoln, Nebraska.

In June 2015, SEMCAT was acquired by Applied Systems, Inc. of University Park, Illinois.

External links 
 SEMCAT web site
 Applied Acquisition Announcement

Financial software